Abbas Aroua is an Algerian medical and health physicist. He is also human rights defender, peace worker and political activist.

Scientific qualifications

 Adjunct Professor (Privat Docent) at the Faculty of Biology and Medicine of the University of Lausanne (since 2006)
 PhD in health physics from the Swiss Federal Institute of Technology in Lausanne (1991)
 Certificate of Expert in Radiological Protection from the University Institute of Radiation Physics at CHUV in Lausanne (1989)
 Master of Science in Medical Physics from the Surrey University in Great Britain (1986)
 Diploma of Higher Studies in Electronics from the University of Science and Technology Houari Boumediene in Algiers (1984)

Activities in human development

 Member of the teaching staff of the "Master of Advanced Studies in Peace and Conflict Transformation", World Peace Academy │ University of Basel (2010-2012)
 Member of the teaching staff of the "Master of Arts in Peace and Conflict Studies", Hacettepe University, Ankara (2013)
 Head of the Arab World Department of the International Transcend Network for Peace, Development and Environment
 Co-founder in 1994 in Geneva of the Hoggar Institute for Human Rights Studies
 Founder in 2002 and director of the Cordoba Peace Institute - Geneva, for peace promotion
 Co-founder in 2004 of the Alkarama Foundation, for human rights
 Co-founder in 2007 of the Rachad Movement, dedicated to radical non violent political change in Algeria and the establishment of the rule of law and good governance
 Co-founder in 2009 of the Arab Organization for Freedoms and Good Governance
 Co-founder in 2010 of the Compostelle-Cordoue NGO for interfaith dialogue
 Organizer and participant at numerous seminars, training workshops and conferences, and author and editor of numerous reports, scientific papers and books in the field of conflict resolution and human development

Activities in public health

 Director of the Swiss company AHEAD S.A. (aroua health & education) specialized in training, research and consulting in the field of medical physics and radiological protection
 Lecturer at the Faculty of Biology and Medicine of the University of Lausanne
 Founder in 2003 of a working group on the exposure of the population by medical radiology, which later became the European Dose Datamed Group
 Member of several national and international learned societies
 Author and co-author of tens of scientific papers and reports in the field of public health

Publications in medical and health physics
 Peer-reviewed journal articles
 Contributions in scientific meetings
 Various reports and chapters

Publications in human rights and conflict & peace
 Addressing Violence and Extremism: The Importance of Terminology, January 2018.
 The Salafiscape in the Wake of the Arab Spring, November 2017.
 Sufism, Politics and Violence: Reading Notes, September 2017.
 Peace, Conflict, and Conflict Transformation in the Islamic Tradition. In Religion, Conflict, and Peacemaking: An Interdisciplinary Conversation. Edited by Muriel Schmid, 2017.
 The Quest for Peace in the Islamic Tradition. Kolofon Press, Oslo 2013.
 The Muslim Diaspora in Europe and the USA. Johan Galtung et al., Transcend & Cordoba Foundation of Geneva, 2012.
 عمل الخير: مقاربة شاملة للأمن البشري، مؤسسة قرطبة ومعهد الهقار، جنيف 2012.
 Mediating Tensions over Islam in Denmark, Holland, and Switzerland. Simon J A Mason, Abbas Aroua, Annika Åberg. CSS-ETH Zürich & Cordoba Foundation of Geneva, 2010.
 تاريخ التعذيب وأصول تحريمه في الإسلام، محمد بن طارية، عباس عروة، يوسف بجاوي، مؤسسة قرطبة، جنيف 2008.
 L'amnistie et les fondements de la paix. In "Quelle Réconciliation pour l'Algérie?". Ouvrage collectif. Hoggar, Geneva 2005.
 La Charte de la Moukalaha, ou la grande duperie. In "Quelle Réconciliation pour l'Algérie?". Ouvrage collectif. Hoggar, Geneva 2005.
 Limitations et acceptabilité de l'amnistie en Algérie. In "Quelle Réconciliation pour l'Algérie?". Ouvrage collectif. Hoggar, Geneva 2005.
 Quelques expériences d'amnistie à méditer. In "Quelle Réconciliation pour l'Algérie?". Ouvrage collectif. Hoggar, Geneva 2005.
 قراءة في تاريخ التعذيب، فصل في كتاب "تحقيق عن التعذيب في الجزائر"، منتدى باحثي شمال إفريقيا، الهقار، جنيف 2003.
 Horroris Causa: Féminisme à l'ère de la Sainte-Eradication. Hoggar, Genève 2000.
 Eléments de Politique Algérienne de la France. In "An Inquiry into the Algerian Massacres". Edited by Bedjaoui Y, Aroua A and Aït-Larbi M. Hoggar, Geneva 1999.
 L'Organisation des Nations Unies et les Massacres en Algérie. In "An Inquiry into the Algerian Massacres". Edited by Bedjaoui Y, Aroua A and Aït-Larbi M. Hoggar, Geneva 1999.
 L'Union Européenne et les Massacres en Algérie. In "An Inquiry into the Algerian Massacres". Edited by Bedjaoui Y, Aroua A and Aït-Larbi M. Hoggar, Geneva 1999.
 Reading Notes on French Colonial Massacres in Algeria. In "An Inquiry into the Algerian Massacres". Edited by Bedjaoui Y, Aroua A and Aït-Larbi M. Hoggar, Geneva 1999.
 Une Diplomatie en Guerre contre les ONG des Droits de l’Homme. In "An Inquiry into the Algerian Massacres". Edited by Bedjaoui Y, Aroua A and Aït-Larbi M. Hoggar, Geneva 1999.
 La torture se nourrit de silence. In "L'Algérie en murmure". Moussa Aït-Embarek. Hoggar, Genève 1995.
 Notes de lecture sur la violence culturelle. In "L'Algérie en murmure". Moussa Aït-Embarek. Hoggar, Genève 1995.
 Cri d'un détenu. In "L'Algérie en murmure". Moussa Aït-Embarek. Hoggar, Genève 1995.

Blogs
 Blog at Mediapart
 Blog at Tribune de Genève
 Blog at Cordoba Peace Institute - Geneva
 Blog at Hoggar Institute

External links
World Peace Academy
Hacettepe University
Transcend Network
Hoggar Institute
Cordoba Peace Institute - Geneva
Alkarama Foundation
Rachad Movement
Compostelle-Cordoue Association
Aroua Health & Education
Lausanne Faculty of Biology and Medicine

1962 births
Living people
Alumni of the University of Surrey
Algerian activists
Algerian human rights activists
Health physicists
Medical physicists
21st-century Algerian people